LVVPU (ЛВВПУ СА и ВМФ), was a football team based in Lviv, Ukrainian SSR.

History
The club was founded sometime in 1960s and originally called a team of Lviv Higher Military-Political School (LVVPU) and belonging to the Soviet Lviv Military-Political College (today the Sahaidachny Academy of Land Forces).

Among notable players were Zoltan Miles.

Honors
Soviet Cup for collective teams of physical culture
 Holders (1): 1966
 Finalists (1): 1965

Ukrainian Cup for collective teams of physical culture
 Holders: (2): 1966, 1968
 Finalists (1): 1965

Lviv Oblast football championship
 Winners (1): 1963,
 Runners-up (2): 1971, 1973,

Lviv Oblast Cup
 Holders (1): 1965,

Coaches
 1966–1966 Mikhail Khodukin
 1971–1971 Ernest Kesler

See also
 FC Sokil Lviv

References

LVVPU Lviv
Football clubs in Lviv
Defunct football clubs in Ukraine
Association football clubs established in the 1960s
Association football clubs disestablished in the 1970s
1960s establishments in Ukraine
1970s disestablishments in Ukraine